Alloclavaria purpurea is a coral fungus commonly known as the purple coral, or the purple fairy club. Formerly known as Clavaria purpurea, it has been moved to its own genus as a result of phylogenetic analysis.

Description
The color is purple or lavender, although the color fades to tan in older specimens. The spore print is white. It is reportedly edible but insubstantial. Fruit bodies are found in spruce-fir forests.

References

External links

Index Fungorum
Roger's Mushrooms Description

Edible fungi
Fungi described in 1821
Repetobasidiaceae
Taxa named by Elias Magnus Fries